Geoffrey Raymond Lyons  (born 29 April 1953), an Australian former politician, was a member of the Australian House of Representatives for the seat of Bass in Tasmania, representing the Australian Labor Party. He succeeded Labor MP Jodie Campbell, who retired from politics, at the 2010 federal election.

Background
Lyons previously worked in public health. He was later head of office for Peter Patmore, the state Attorney-General, before contesting the state seat of Bass unsuccessfully at the 2002 state election. Prior to his election he had worked for both his predecessor Jodie Campbell and Senator Helen Polley.

Lyons is married with three children.

References

External links
Biography for LYONS, Geoffrey (Geoff) Raymond (Parliament of Australia)
Official Website for Geoff Lyons

1953 births
Living people
Australian Labor Party members of the Parliament of Australia
Members of the Australian House of Representatives
Members of the Australian House of Representatives for Bass
Recipients of the Medal of the Order of Australia
21st-century Australian politicians